
Gmina Boguchwała is an urban-rural gmina (administrative district) in Rzeszów County, Subcarpathian Voivodeship, in south-eastern Poland.

Villages
Apart from the town of Boguchwała, Gmina Boguchwała contains the villages and settlements of Kielanówka, Lutoryż, Mogielnica, Niechobrz, Nosówka, Racławówka, Wola Zgłobieńska, Zarzecze and Zgłobień.

Neighbouring gminas
Gmina Boguchwała is bordered by the city of Rzeszów and by the gminas of Czudec, Iwierzyce, Lubenia, Świlcza and Tyczyn.

References
Polish official population figures 2006

Boguchwala
Rzeszów County